Hamed Malekmohammadi Memar (born April 10, 1983) is an Iranian former judoka, who played for both the lightweight and half-middleweight categories. He won the silver medal for the men's 81 kg class at the 2008 Asian Judo Championships in Jeju City, South Korea, losing out to South Korea's Kim Jae-Bum.

In 2001, he refused to compete against Israeli Olympian Yoel Razvozov.

Malekmohammadi took part in the 2004 Summer Olympics in Athens, where he competed for the men's 73 kg class. He reached the second preliminary match of the competition, where he lost by an ippon to Moldova's Victor Bivol. Malekmohammadi, however, offered another shot for a bronze medal shot by entering the repechage bouts. He defeated Richard Leon of Venezuela in the first round, before losing out at the last few seconds to Portugal's João Neto.

At the 2008 Summer Olympics in Beijing, Malekmohammadi competed for a higher class, men's half-middleweight division. He lost again in the second preliminary match this time, to Brazil's Tiago Camilo, who successfully scored an ippon in the middle of a five-minute period. Unlike his first Olympics, Malekmohammadi did not qualify for the repechage, when his opponent got eliminated in the subsequent match.

See also
Boycotts of Israel in individual sports

References

External links

NBC Olympics Profile

Iranian male judoka
1983 births
Living people
Olympic judoka of Iran
Judoka at the 2004 Summer Olympics
Judoka at the 2008 Summer Olympics
Asian Games bronze medalists for Iran
Asian Games medalists in judo
Judoka at the 2002 Asian Games
Medalists at the 2002 Asian Games
21st-century Iranian people